Francis Hoyt Gregory (October 9, 1789 – October 4, 1866) was an officer in the United States Navy during the War of 1812 through to the Civil War, serving then as a rear admiral.

Early life
Gregory was born in Norwalk, Connecticut, the son of Moses Gregory and Esther Hoyt. He was the third great-grandson of John Gregory, founding settler of Norwalk. While in the American merchant marine, he was impressed by the British in an incident typical of those which led in part to the War of 1812. After escaping, Gregory was appointed a midshipman on January 16, 1809, by President Jefferson and reported to the Revenge, commanded by Oliver Hazard Perry.

Anti-Piracy operations
In March, 1809, Gregory was transferred to the Gulf Squadron at New Orleans, Louisiana. In 1811, while serving in the Vesuvius and as acting captain of Gun Boat 162, Gregory participated in three notable actions. On August 7, off Pensacola, Midshipman Gregory attacked and crippled the pirate schooner La Franchise. On August 10, off Mobile, he attacked and captured the pirate schooner Santa Maria. On September 11, between Brassa and Barataria, Louisiana, Midshipman Gregory and his crew captured the pirate ship La Divina, and the schooners La Sophie and Le Vengeance.

War of 1812
During the War of 1812 between America and Britain.  Gregory conducted maritime guerrilla operations against the British.

Raiding the Black Snake
On June 15, 1814, Francis Gregory and his fellow American sailors set out with 3 gigs. The Americans landed on Tar Island and hid their boats in the scrub undergrowth. Gregory and his fellow raiders observed from their hidden post. In the morning, Gregory spotted a British vessel called the Black Snaked manned by 20 Royal Marines and Canadian militia. The Americans approached the vessel by their gigs. The British crew spotted the gigs. The American raiders pretended to be fellow British sailors and waved at them in a friendly way. The British crew thinking it was a friendly vessel that was part of a British convoy allowed the American gigs to come closer. At Gregory’s signal, the Americans jumped the Black Snake and captured all 20 British marines and Canadian militia. One British marine was badly injured. The Americans suffered no casualties. While the Americans in their gigs were transporting their prisoners and prize vessel Black Snake. Two British gunboats with 150 heavily armed British sailors arrived seeking to retake the vessel. Gregory realized he would be overtaken as the 150 British sailors in their gunboats were catching up. So Gregory moved all of his prisoners on to his gigs and sank the Black Snake. The Black Snake sank rapidly and slowed the British who were distracted into salvaging the sunken vessel as the American raiders escaped. The American raiders arrived safely with their 20 prisoners at Sackets Harbor the next morning. In May 4, 1834. Gregory and his raiders were awarded by the U.S. government $3,000 dollars for this successful maritime guerrilla raid.

Sabotaging a British Schooner
In Gregory’s next maritime guerrilla operation, he and his raiders were ordered to sabotage and destroy a British schooner that was under construction and being built for 14 guns. On July 1st, 1814, Gregory set out with his fellow raiders. After the American raiders sailed and hid out of sight. They rowed for the small harbor where the British schooner sat on the stocks, surrounded by houses. The Americans slipped into the dark harbor and landed without notice. Gregory placed scouts at the edge of nearby homes and sent the rest of his force under the schooner to set fire combustibles. Gregory’s raiders inspected the ship as they set the fire explosives. The Schooner looked like it was ready to launch in two weeks after construction. The American raiders returned to their boats as the flames of the combustible explosives engulfed and destroyed the schooner. A storehouse containing supplies for the shipyard was also burned by the combustibles. The American raiders returned safely back to Sackets Harbor.

Raiding and destroying a raft of timber before being captured
In August 26,1814, Gregory and his fellow raiders went out on another maritime guerrilla operation. Gregory and his fellow raiders were silently rowing. They spotted a British civilian transporting a raft of timber. Gregory did not want to pass this target of opportunity and surprised the British sailor. Gregory’s raiders captured the British sailor and burned the raft of timber. The American raiders rowed on as stealthily as they could before hidden British vessels with armed sailors spotted them. The British gave chase. Gregory knowing that the British always put effort into saving or salvaging sinking British sailors or vessels decided to conduct a ploy. Gregory pushed the British prisoner he had captured into the water to distract the pursuers. The British sailors seeing through the deception threw an oar for the sailor to float on and continued to pursue the raiders. The British sailors fired their rifles with good accuracy at the fleeing American raiders. Four of the eight Americans were wounded and another killed. Gregory seeing no hope for escape surrendered. All the American raiders were taken prisoner. Gregory was British custody and refused parole.

End of the war and release
After being sent to England, Gregory remained there until June 1815, months after the end of hostilities. He was finally released.

Command assignments, 1820s to early 1830s
After he was released by the British, Gregory joined the Mediterranean Squadron and operated along the North African coast until 1821. In that year, he became captain of Grampus and spent the following two years cruising the West Indies to suppress piracy. While in the Indies, Gregory captured the notorious pirate brig Panchita and destroyed several other pirate ships. In 1824, Gregory fitted out the frigate Brandywine, destined to carry the Marquis de la Fayette back to France.  In 1826 Gregory sailed a 64-gun frigate named HELLAS from Christopher Bergh's shipyard in New York City's lower East Side to Greece for the revolutionary government.   The Hellas became the Greek Navy's first flagship, fighting for the country's independence from the Ottoman Empire.  From 1824 to 1828 Gregory served at the New York Navy Yard, and in 1831 reported to the Pacific Station for a three-year cruise in command of Falmouth. Gregory served as commander of the Station for one year.

Command assignments, late 1830s to 1850s
From the Pacific Ocean, Gregory—appointed a Captain in 1838—sailed to the Gulf of Mexico, where he commanded North Carolina and Raritan and served in the blockade of the Mexican coast during the Mexican–American War.

After the Mexican War, Gregory commanded the squadron off the African coast, with Portsmouth as his flagship, until June 1851. Returning to the United States, he became commandant of the Boston Navy Yard in May 1852 and served there through February 1856. His subsequent retirement ended a Navy career that had spanned nearly 50 years.

Civil War duty and last years
When the Civil War rolled across the land, Gregory returned to naval service to superintend the construction and fitting-out of naval vessels in private shipyards, including iron-clad vessels.  Promoted to Rear Admiral July 16, 1862, he served throughout the four years of war and then retired again.

Rear Admiral Gregory died in Brooklyn, New York, on October 4, 1866, and was buried at New Haven, Connecticut.

Legacy
Two ships were named USS Gregory for him.

There is an old family story related to Admiral Gregory during his imprisonment in England during the War of 1812.

He had been placed under "house arrest" at a country estate, where he lived by a gentleman's agreement not to attempt escape by passing beyond certain boundaries, one of which was defined by a large stone marker.  At some point, there was a formal dinner party at another estate a mile or so away that the captain wished to attend, yet was beyond the set boundary.

The dinner guests were surprised during the party by the arrival of the American captain, and he was accused of violating the terms of his incarceration by going beyond the marker.

The captain smilingly ushered the complainants outside...where they found a wheelbarrow parked at the far corner of the house containing the large marker stone.

Admiral Gregory was married to Elizabeth, daughter of Captain John Shaw, an early naval commander and a hero of the 1st Barbary Coast campaign and the War of 1812.

See also

References

Bibliography

External links
 

1780 births
1866 deaths
Union Navy admirals
People from Norwalk, Connecticut
United States Navy rear admirals
United States Navy personnel of the War of 1812
People of Connecticut in the American Civil War
Military personnel from Connecticut
United States Navy personnel of the Mexican–American War
War of 1812 prisoners of war held by the United Kingdom